Astragalus hypoxylus is a rare species of flowering plant in the legume family known by the common name Huachuca milkvetch, or Huachuca Mountain milkvetch. It is endemic to Arizona in the United States, where it is known only from the Patagonia and Huachuca Mountains. There are three populations.

It grows from a fibrous taproot. The alternately arranged leaves are each made up of several pairs of gray-green leaflets which are a few millimeters long. The flowers bloom in April and May and are pollinated by bees of the genera Anthophora, Bombus, and Osmia. This Astragalus looks so different from other species that it was once classified in a monotypic genus all its own.

This plant grows in woodlands dominated by Emory oak (Quercus emoryi), Mexican blue oak (Q. oblongifolia), alligator juniper (Juniperus deppeana), and Mexican pinyon (Pinus discolor). The substrate is a gravelly soil rich in limestone and metamorphic rock.

References

External links
USDA Plants Profile

hypoxylus
Flora of Arizona
Plants described in 1882